The 14th Golden Globe Awards, honoring the best in film for 1956 films, were held on February 28, 1957, at the Cocoanut Grove, Ambassador Hotel (Los Angeles).

Winners and Nominees

Best Motion Picture - Drama
Around the World in 80 Days directed by Michael Anderson
 Giant directed by George Stevens
 Lust for Life directed by Vincente Minnelli
 The Rainmaker directed by Joseph Anthony
 War and Peace directed by King Vidor

Best Motion Picture - Comedy or Musical
 The King and I directed by Walter Lang
Bus Stop directed by Joshua Logan
The Opposite Sex directed by David Miller
The Solid Gold Cadillac directed by Richard Quine
The Teahouse of the August Moon directed by Daniel Mann

Best Performance  by an Actor in a Leading Role - Drama
Kirk Douglas - Lust for Life
Gary Cooper - Friendly Persuasion
Charlton Heston - The Ten Commandments
Burt Lancaster - The Rainmaker
Karl Malden -  Baby Doll

Best Performance by an Actress in a Leading Role - Drama
Ingrid Bergman - Anastasia
Carroll Baker - Baby Doll
Helen Hayes - Anastasia
Katharine Hepburn - The Rainmaker
Audrey Hepburn - War and Peace

Best Performance by an Actor in a Leading Role - Comedy or Musical
Cantinflas - Around the World in 80 Days
Marlon Brando - The Teahouse of the August Moon
Yul Brynner - The King and I
Glenn Ford - The Teahouse of the August Moon
Danny Kaye - The Court Jester

Best Performance by an Actress in a Leading Role - Comedy or Musical
Deborah Kerr - The King and I
Judy Holliday - The Solid Gold Cadillac 
Machiko Kyō - The Teahouse of the August Moon
Marilyn Monroe - Bus Stop
Debbie Reynolds - Bundle of Joy

Best Performance by an Actor in a Supporting Role in a Motion Picture
Earl Holliman - The Rainmaker
Eddie Albert - The Teahouse of the August Moon
Oscar Homolka - War and Peace
Anthony Quinn - Lust for Life
Eli Wallach - Baby Doll

Best Performance by an Actress in a Supporting Role in a Motion Picture
Eileen Heckart - The Bad Seed
Mildred Dunnock - Baby Doll
Marjorie Main - Friendly Persuasion
Dorothy Malone - Written on the Wind
Patty McCormack - The Bad Seed

Best Director-Motion Picture
Elia Kazan - Baby Doll
Michael Anderson - Around the World in 80 Days
Vincente Minnelli - Lust for Life
George Stevens - Giant 
King Vidor - War and Peace

Most Promising Newcomer - Male
Three way tie

Most Promising Newcomer - Female
Three way tie

New Foreign Star of the year - Actor
Jacques Bergerac

New Foreign star of the year - Actress
Taina Elg

Best Film Promoting International Understanding
 Battle Hymn directed by Douglas Sirk
Friendly Persuasion directed by William Wyler
The King and I directed by Walter Lang
The Teahouse of the August Moon directed by Daniel Mann

Television Achievement - Best TV Show

Cecil B. Demille Award
Mervyn LeRoy

Hollywood Citizenship Award
Ronald Reagan

Special Achievement Awards

Henrietta Award (World Film Favorites)
James Dean and Kim Novak

References

014
1956 film awards
1956 television awards
1956 awards in the United States
February 1957 events in the United States